Kulpani Mandir॥ॐ॥कुलपानी मन्दिर is a Shiva temple located in Gadhawa Rural Municipality ward no. 1,Badahara Dang Deukhuri District Nepal.

Kulpani park
Kulpani park; a recreational area within Kulpani temple territory, is being developing as an eco-tourism area with the help of local government and Kulpani community forest consumer committee; a committee of local people for sustainable forest management that ensures demand of wood for local people and also works for poverty elimination, personal development and ability enhancement.

References

Hindu temples in Lumbini Province